Gay Street School is a historic school building located in Phoenixville, Chester County, Pennsylvania. It has two sections.  The older section, the west wing, was built in 1874, and is a two-story, brick structure. The two-story east wing and three-story central section were added in 1883.  The building features a clock and bell tower.

It was listed on the National Register of Historic Places in 1983.

References 
 

School buildings on the National Register of Historic Places in Pennsylvania
School buildings completed in 1883
Schools in Chester County, Pennsylvania
National Register of Historic Places in Chester County, Pennsylvania